Vishvanatha Chakravarti Thakur (1626 –  1708) was a Gaudiya Vaishnava acharya born in the village of Devagram, which is now in the Nadia district of West Bengal, India. His parents were Radhi Sreni brahmanas. He also had two brothers named Rambhadra and Raghunatha.

His initiating guru was Sriyuta Krsnacarana Cakravarti of Saiyadabad, Murshidabad, who was fourth in the line from Narottama Dasa. Visvanatha Chakravarti resided with his guru for many years and composed many books during that time.

His studies of grammar, poetry and rhetoric were completed while he still lived at Nadia. There is a story that he defeated one conquering pandit while he himself was still only a student. From his childhood he was completely indifferent to household life. In order to keep him at home, his father had him married at a very young age. However, he finally renounced family life and came to live at Vrindavana. His family members tried to bring him back but were unsuccessful.

Sri Chakravarti Thakura took up residence with Mukunda Dasa, who lived in Krishnadasa Kaviraja Gosvami's bhajana kutir at Radha-kunda. There he very intently studied the books and letters of the Gosvamis and composed many commentaries on their writings.

He used to worship a deity named Golokananda. He was also known by the pen name Harivallabha Das, under which he wrote a number of Vaishnava songs.
Most notably his famous song Sri Guru Vandana, is sung every morning during Mangal Arati around 04:30 AM in every ISKCON temple throughout the world.

He composed the following books on Gaudiya Vaishnava Theology:

Vraja-riti-cintamani
Camatkara-candrika
Prema-samputa
Gitavali
Subodhini, a commentary on the Alankara-Kaustabha
Ananda-Candrika, a commentary on Ujjvala-Nilamani
A commentary on the Gopala Tapani Upanishad
Stavamrta-Lahri
Sri-Krishna-bhavanamrta-mahakavya
Sri Bhagavatamrta Kana
Sri Ujjavala-nilamani-kirana
Sri Bhakti-rasamrta-sindhu-bindu
Dana-Keli Kaumudi-tika
Sri Lalita-madhava-nataka-tika
Sri Caitanya-caritamrta-tika(incomplete)
Brahma-Samhita-tika
Sarartha-Varsini tika
Sarartha-darsini tika

He died on the Vasanta-pancami in the month of Magha.

References

Gaudiya religious leaders
People from Mathura
Year of birth uncertain
Year of death uncertain